"Pray" is a song by Swiss artist DJ BoBo, released in September 1996 as the lead single from his third album, World in Motion (1996). It features vocals by American singers Lori Glori and Jocelyn Brown, and the choir United Spirits. Successful in Europe, it peaked at number two in Finland and Switzerland, number three in France and Germany, number five in Hungary and number six in Austria. On the Eurochart Hot 100, the single reached number 13 in October 1996. It sold to Gold in Germany.

Critical reception
Pan-European magazine Music & Media wrote, "An excellent combination of a fast radio friendly beat, Eurodance raps and an impressive gospel choir. It's already doing well in the GSA countries, but this should charm EHR programmers everywhere."

Music video
The music video for "Pray" was shot in autumn of 1996 and was directed by Bernd-Peter Rothfuss.

Track listing

Charts

Weekly charts

Year-end charts

References

 

1996 singles
1996 songs
DJ BoBo songs
English-language Swiss songs
Jocelyn Brown songs
Songs written by Axel Breitung
Songs written by DJ BoBo
ZYX Music singles